Monotigma is a genus of sea snails, marine gastropod mollusks in the family Pyramidellidae, the pyrams and their allies. The status of this genus was for a long time confused, but the situation was clarified in a review by van Aartsen (1986).

Life habits
Little is known about the biology of the members of this genus. As is true of most members of the Pyramidellidae sensu lato, they are most likely to be ectoparasites.

Species
Species within the genus Monotigma include:
 Monotigma eximia (Lischke, 1872)
 Monotigma fulva (A. Adams, 1853)
 Monotigma lauta (Adams, 1853)
 Monotigma pareximia (Nomura, 1936)
 Monotigma suturalis (A. Adams, 1853)

References

 Vaught, K.C. (1989). A classification of the living Mollusca. American Malacologists: Melbourne, FL (USA). . XII, 195 pp.
 Gofas, S.; Le Renard, J.; Bouchet, P. (2001). Mollusca, in: Costello, M.J. et al. (Ed.) (2001). European register of marine species: a check-list of the marine species in Europe and a bibliography of guides to their identification. Collection Patrimoines Naturels, 50: pp. 180–213
 Aartsen, J. J. van (1986). "Nomenclatural notes I. On Actaeopyramis as related to Monoptygma, Monotigma and Monotygma". Bolettino Malacologico 22 (5-8): 182–184.

External links
 To World Register of Marine Species

Pyramidellidae